Kent Branstetter is a former tackle in the National Football League.

Biography
Branstetter was born Kent Wayne Branstetter on February 3, 1949 in Galveston, Texas.

Career
Branstetter was drafted in the ninth round of the 1972 NFL Draft by the New Orleans Saints and later played with the Green Bay Packers during the 1973 NFL season. He played at the collegiate level at the University of Houston.

See also

List of Green Bay Packers players

References

1949 births
Living people
People from Galveston, Texas
Green Bay Packers players
University of Houston alumni
Houston Cougars football players
Tyler Apaches football players
American football offensive tackles